Makedonikos Stadium (greek: Γήπεδο Μακεδονικού / Gipedo Makedonikou) is a football stadium located in Thessaloniki, Greece. It is home to Makedonikos football club.

The stadium was also used by Iraklis FC for two seasons when the Kaftanzoglio Stadium was under renovation for Athens 2004 Olympics. For that reason, during 2002, it was upgraded to meet Greece 1st division standards.

On 5 June 1983, its record attendance was set with 9,422 attendants for the match Makedonikos FC vs Olympiacos.

It has also been used for live concerts by Ska-P, Scorpions and others.

External links
 Makedonikos Stadium profile at Stadia.gr

Football venues in Greece
Sports venues in Thessaloniki